Francisco Lisvaldo Daniel Duarte (born 16 November 1990 in Uiraúna), Brazil, commonly known as Esquerdinha, is a Brazilian footballer, who currently plays for Sousa Esporte Clube.

Career statistics

Club

References

External links

1990 births
Living people
Brazilian footballers
Association football midfielders
Boa Esporte Clube players
Treze Futebol Clube players
Clube Atlético Bragantino players
KF Skënderbeu Korçë players
C.S. Marítimo players
Madureira Esporte Clube players
Ferroviário Atlético Clube (CE) players
Esporte Clube Juventude players
Alebrijes de Oaxaca players
Guarany Sporting Club players
Campeonato Brasileiro Série B players
Campeonato Brasileiro Série C players
Campeonato Brasileiro Série D players
Kategoria Superiore players
Primeira Liga players
Ascenso MX players
Brazilian expatriate footballers
Brazilian expatriate sportspeople in Albania
Brazilian expatriate sportspeople in Portugal
Brazilian expatriate sportspeople in Mexico
Expatriate footballers in Albania
Expatriate footballers in Portugal
Expatriate footballers in Mexico